Moniek Tenniglo (born 2 May 1988) is a Dutch professional racing cyclist, who most recently rode for UCI Women's WorldTeam .

Major results

2015
 3rd Road race, South Holland Provincial Road Championships
 9th Marianne Vos Classic
 10th Gent–Wevelgem
2016
 1st Stage 2a (TTT) Giro del Trentino Alto Adige-Südtirol
 3rd Crescent Vårgårda UCI Women's WorldTour TTT
 8th Omloop van de IJsseldelta
2017
 2nd 7-Dorpenomloop Aalburg
 3rd Overall Gracia–Orlová
 5th Overall BeNe Ladies Tour
2019
 8th La Classique Morbihan
 8th Clasica Femenina Navarra

See also
 List of 2015 UCI Women's Teams and riders

References

External links

1988 births
Living people
Dutch female cyclists
People from Tubbergen
20th-century Dutch women
21st-century Dutch women
Cyclists from Overijssel